Shah Rostam Abbasi, also known as Malek Rostam, was the Khorshidi hakem (governor) of Khorramabad and Lorestan. He was the first Khorshidi ruler to acknowledge Safavid suzerainty, and was confirmed as a governor by Shah Ismail I in 1508. This part of Khorshidi history is obscure; the next known Khorshidi governor was Shah Rostam's son Mir Ughur ibn Shah Rostam, attested in 1540.

References

Sources 
 
 

Year of birth unknown
16th-century deaths
16th-century people of Safavid Iran
Safavid governors of Lorestan